Tabuina is a genus of Papuan jumping spiders that was first described by Wayne Paul Maddison in 2009.  it contains only three species, found only in Papua New Guinea: T. baiteta, T. rufa, and T. varirata.

References

External links
Tabuina rufa
Tabuina varirata

Arthropods of New Guinea
Endemic fauna of New Guinea
Salticidae
Salticidae genera
Spiders of Oceania